Maureen Nkeiruka Mmadu (born 7 May 1975) is a Nigerian football coach and former midfielder. As a player she most recently represented Avaldsnes IL, a First Division team based on Norway's west coast. She played for several other teams in Norway's Toppserien as well for Linköpings FC and QBIK in the Swedish Damallsvenskan.

Career
She previously played for Klepp IL in the Norwegian Toppserien. Mmadu played for Kolbotn in Oslo, Norway, for the 2010 season, helping them to 3rd place in the Toppserien league. She can be seen playing for Avaldsnes IL in an off-season tournament in Oslo on 5 February 2012

International career
She is also a member for Nigeria and has made more than 100 appearances for the Nigeria women's national football team, including appearing at four FIFA Women's World Cups and has competed in the 2000 and 2004 Summer Olympics.

Contrary to reports that she played more than 100 games for the Nigeria women's national football team, the Nigeria Football Federation has said she only played 52 games.

References

1975 births
Living people
Sportspeople from Onitsha
Nigerian women's footballers
Nigeria women's international footballers
Olympic footballers of Nigeria
Footballers at the 2000 Summer Olympics
Expatriate women's footballers in Norway
Footballers at the 2004 Summer Olympics
1995 FIFA Women's World Cup players
1999 FIFA Women's World Cup players
2003 FIFA Women's World Cup players
2007 FIFA Women's World Cup players
FIFA Century Club
Linköpings FC players
Damallsvenskan players
QBIK players
Toppserien players
Klepp IL players
SK Brann Kvinner players
Amazon Grimstad players
Kolbotn Fotball players
Avaldsnes IL players
Expatriate women's footballers in Sweden
Nigerian expatriate footballers
Nigerian expatriate sportspeople in Sweden
Nigerian expatriate sportspeople in Norway
Women's association football midfielders